Marurui is a neighbourhood in the city of Nairobi.

Overview
The estate is believed to have got its name from a medical plant know as Olmaroroi by the Maasai. The neighbourhood is zoned as a low-density residential suburb with single-family homes. Marurui hosts the high-income, middle-income to some low-income residents. The neighbourhood contains the slum of Gathara (known as Jua Kali by its residents).

The neighbourhood is bordered by Garden Estate, Thome, Roysambu, Kasarani and Mirema.

Roysambu Constituency and Roysambu ward, both electoral divisions, cover the neighbourhood. The constituency encompasses other estates and neighbourhoods such as: Garden Estate, Thome, Ridgeways, Kiwanja, Njathaini, Ngomongo, Kongo Soweto, parts of Kahawa and Githurai, Mirema, Kamiti, and Zimmerman. Both electoral divisions are within the Kasarani Sub-county

As of 2019, Marurui together with Njathaini had a population of 11,522, with 5,920 of them being male and 5,600 being female. The neighbourhood had a population density of 2,769/km2 in a land area of 4.2 km.2

Points of interest
 Starehe Girls' Centre, is located in Marurui.
 Windsor Golf Club, located in Marurui.

References

Suburbs of Nairobi